Alexander Friedrich Wilhelm Duncker (February 18, 1813 – August 23, 1879) was a German publisher and bookseller.

Life and family
He was descended from a successful Berlin family of booksellers, born in Berlin, the son of Carl Friedrich Wilhelm Duncker (1781–1869) and Fanny Duncker (née Wolff). His brothers included historian and politician Maximilian Duncker (1811–1886), and publisher and pundit Franz Duncker (1822–1888), founder of a trade union with labor economist Max Hirsch (1832–1905). Another brother, Hermann Carl Rudolf Duncker (1817–1892) was a member of the Prussian National Assembly and a mayor of Berlin.

Duncker's father had founded the publishing firm  in 1809, running it alone after business partner Peter Humblot died in 1828. Alexander Duncker started his education in 1829. After apprenticeships with Friedrich Christoph Perthes and Johann Besser in Hamburg, Duncker founded his own firm, "Verlag Alexander Duncker." His firm specialized in Belles lettres (German: Belletristik) and visual arts. Among the authors he published were Thekla von Gumpert, Ida Hahn-Hahn, Paul Heyse, Karl von Holtei, August Kopisch, Fanny Lewald, Elise Polko, Christian Friedrich Scherenberg, Hermann von Pückler-Muskau, and Friedrich von Uechtriz. He was instrumental in promoting new authors, and some of them Emanuel Geibel, Wilhelm Jensen, Marie Petersen, Gustav zu Putlitz, and Theodor Storm found their first recognition through Duncker's efforts.

Duncker had far-reaching political connections and regularly corresponded with King Friedrich Wilhelm IV. Later, he maintained contact with Emperor William I. From 1841 he held the title "Royal Court Bookseller." As a reserve officer attaining the rank of lieutenant colonel, he participated in the wars against Denmark (1864), Austria (1866), and France (1870-71).

Works
A high point in his output was a graphic collection of Prussian castles under the title, The rural residences, palaces and residences of the Prussian nobility, together with the royal family, vacation home, and garden residences in vivid, artistically executed, colorful illustrations with accompanying text appearing from 1857-1883. The series of 320 signatures in 16 volumes included 960 color lithographs measuring 20x15 cm. The collection is especially valuable for its pictorial record of numerous stately buildings from the old eastern German lands, many of which were destroyed during and after World War II when these regions were transferred to Poland and the Soviet Union.

Another large project was an edition of the political correspondence of Frederick the Great, which by Duncker's death had appeared in 24 volumes – eventually totaling 46 volumes by 1939 when it was interrupted by the second world war. The project resumed with the issue of volume 47 in 2003.

Duncker also wrote works including:
 1851 The Patriots: National drama in three acts.
 1867 Through Night to the Light. A time story
 1877 Off the road. Poems of a vagabond
 1886 Angiola Folimarino (novella)
 1891 Her Picture (novella)
 1897 The Swallows. A children's tale.

Bibliography

 Dora Duncker: Das Haus Duncker. Ein Buchhändlerroman aus dem Biedermeier. Berlin 1918 (mainly about Carl Friedrich Wilhelm Duncker)
 Peter-Michael Hahn und Hellmut Lorenz (Ed.): Herrenhäuser in Brandenburg und der Niederlausitz. Kommentierte Neuausgabe des Ansichtenwerks von Alexander Duncker (1857–1883). Nicolai, Berlin 2000, Volume 1 Introduction, Volume 2 Catalog
 
 Soetemann, Christel: Alexander Dunckers 'Ländliche Wohnsitze, Schlösser und Residenzen der Preußischen Monarchie'. Tausend Veduten zwischen Tilsit und Trier. from: Lüneburger Beiträge zur Vedutenforschung. Edited Eckhard Jäger. Lüneburg: Verlag Nordostdeutsches Kulturwerk, 1983. pp. 173–210
 Loeck, Gottfried: Alexander Dunckers Werk über die ländlichen Wohnsitze der ritterschaftlichen Grundbesitzer Preußens - eine wertvolle Quelle zur pommerschen Geschichte. from: Baltische Studien - Pommersche Jahrbücher für Landesgeschichte. Edited by Gesellschaft für pommersche Geschichte, Altertumskunde und Kunst e.V ., Vol. 82, pp. 99–119.

1813 births
1879 deaths
German publishers (people)
German booksellers
Businesspeople from Berlin
Prussian Army personnel